During the Muslim rule on Sicily, the island was divided into three different administrative regions: the Val di Noto in the southeast, the Val Demone in the northeast and the Val di Mazara in the west. Each zone has a noticeably different agriculture and topography and they converged near Enna (Castrogiovanni).

There are many Arab-derived names in  the Val di Mazara (and more Christians converted to Islam from this region), are more mixed in the Val di Noto, while Christian (particularly Greek) identities survived strongest in the Val Demone (with the least Arab-derived names), which was the last to fall to the Muslims, where Christian refugees from other parts of Sicily had assembled, and which furthermore remained in contact with Byzantine southern Italy. Even in 21st century Sicily, differences between the east and west of the island are often explained by locals as being due to the Greek and Arab descent of the populations, respectively. Later Christian Lombard settlements would split the remaining Muslims of Sicily in half, separating the Val di Mazara and the Val di Noto.

Even after Muslim rule, the three valli system was still continued up until 1818, when Sicily was divided into seven provinces. From the 16–17th century, the population of Val di Noto expanded the most slowly of the three valli, with Val di Mazara growing the fastest.

The three valli are represented by the three-legged Trinacria symbol, which appears on the flag of Sicily.

Etymology 

See also
Muslim conquest of Sicily

References

Emirate of Sicily